Center School District 58 is a school district headquartered in Kansas City, Missouri.

Schools
Secondary:
 Center High School
 Center Middle School

Elementary:
 Boone Elementary
 Center Elementary
 Indian Creek Elementary
 Red Bridge Elementary
 South City View Elementary School (permanently closed)
 Center Annex Elementary School (permanently closed)

Preschool:
 Early Childhood Center

Alternative:
 Center Academy for Success

References

External links
 

School districts in Missouri